Ross Hornby is a Canadian lawyer, public servant and diplomat who was Canada's Ambassador to the European Union in Brussels, from June 2006 to July 2011. Prior to that, he had many posts including the Foreign Service Legal Bureau and Canada Permanent Mission at the United Nations in Geneva, senior counsel at the Canadian Department of Justice, general counsel at the Canadian Department of Finance, and Head of Legal Services at the Treasury Board Secretariat of Canada.

Hornby received a Bachelor of Arts at the University of British Columbia in 1975, a Master of Arts at the University of Toronto in 1976 and a Bachelor of Laws at Osgoode Hall Law School in 1980.

References

External links
 Biography of Ross Hornby

Canadian lawyers
University of British Columbia alumni
University of Toronto alumni
Ambassadors of Canada to the European Union
Place of birth missing (living people)
Year of birth missing (living people)
Living people
Osgoode Hall Law School alumni